Alexei Rudolfovich Chizhov (born October 15, 1964 in Izhevsk, Udmurtia, Russian SFSR) is a Russian draughts player who has won the International Draughts World Championship ten times. His first world championship title was in 1988, and his most recent was in 2005. His eighth world championship title, in 1996, broke Isidore Weiss's record of seven world championship titles—a record which had stood for 87 years. USSR national champion (1990), Russian national champion (2016). In 2003, Chizhov headed the World Draughts Federation.

References

External links
World Draughts Federation
Ranking at European draughts site
Biography (in Russian)

1964 births
Living people
People from Izhevsk
Russian draughts players
Soviet draughts players
Players of international draughts